Robert Bagg (born 1935, New Jersey) is an American poet and translator.  He has published several volumes of poetry and has authored critical studies of Sappho and Catullus. He graduated from Amherst College in 1957, received an M.A. from the University of Connecticut in 1961 and a Ph.D. from the same institution in 1965.

In addition to his other literary work, Bagg taught English at the University of Massachusetts Amherst (1965–1996), serving as Department Chair (1986–92).

Translations
 Hippolytus by Euripides (1973)
 The Bakkhai by Euripides (1978)

References

External links
 Robert Bagg: Poet and Translator of Euripides and Sophocles
 Robert Bagg (AC 1957) Papers at the Amherst College Archives & Special Collections

1935 births
Living people
American humanities academics
Poets from New Jersey
American translators
University of Massachusetts Amherst faculty
American male poets
20th-century American poets
Translators of Ancient Greek texts
20th-century American male writers

Amherst College alumni